Bates Creek is a stream in Washington County in the U.S. state of Missouri. It is a tributary of Mine a Breton Creek.

Bates Creek source area lies south of Potosi and it flows north passing west of Potosi before turning northeast and passing under Missouri routes 8 and 185 just before joining the Mine a Breton just northwest of the city.

Bates Creek has the name of Moses Bates, proprietor of a local blast furnace.

See also
List of rivers of Missouri

References

Rivers of Washington County, Missouri
Rivers of Missouri